Thrash or Die  is an American thrash metal band from Miami, Florida. The band was formed in 2007 by vocalist Ralph "Dr Fukk" Viera and lead guitarist William "Hellvomit Sodomizer" Barter. Their first lineup consisted of drummer Cesar "Darth Vodka" Placeres, rhythm guitarist Chris "Triplesixxx Whoremangler" Placeres, and bassist Mario Cianci. This lineup recorded a demo in 2010, and released their debut album Poser Holocaust on May 18, 2011 on the independent label Empingao Records.

References

American thrash metal musical groups
Comedy rock musical groups
Heavy metal musical groups from Florida
Musical quintets